The Dimasa people are an ethnolinguistic community presently inhabiting in Assam and Nagaland states in Northeastern India. They speak Dimasa, a Tibeto-Burman language. This community is fairly homogeneous and exclusive, with members required to draw from both parents' separate clans. Dimasa kingdom, one of many early states in Assam following the downfall of Kamarupa kingdom, was established by these people. The Dimasas were till recently agricultural, centering on shifting agriculture; but in recent times this has changed with profound changes in the community. Following political problems in the 18th century, the Dimasa ruler moved further south in the plains of Cachar and there took place a division among them–with the hills Dimasa maintaining their traditional living and political exclusiveness, the plains Dimasas have made no attempt to assert themselves.

Ancient Dimasa tradition maintains that sixty thousand (60,000) Moon months (Lunar months) ago, they left their ancestral land when it suffered a severe drought.  After long wandering, they settled at Di-laobra Sangibra, the confluence of the Brahmaputra and Sangi or Di-tsang, where they held a great assembly.

The Dimasa
The Dimasas form a "sealed" society—every member drawing his or her patriarchal lineage from one of the forty two male clans (sengphong—"holder of the sword") and the matriarchal lineage from one of the forty-two female clans (jalik or julu). These clans are distributed among twelve territorial "sacred groves" called daikhos.  The Dimasas are one of the oldest inhabitants of the Northeastern part of India and is one of the many Kachari tribes. They live mostly in Dima Hasao District, an administrative autonomous district of the Indian state of Assam that includes the ravines of the Jatinga Valley and Dhansiri Valley, Diphu City and Howraghat region of Karbi Anglong district (East), West Karbi Anglong, Kampur region of Nagaon district, Hojai district, Cachar district, Hailakandi district, Karimganj district of Assam and Dimapur district of Nagaland and parts in Jiribam district of Manipur respectively.

It stands for Di-ma-sa meaning sons of big waters referring to Brahmaputra river (known as Dilao in Dimasa). Kacharis appear to be one of the earliest indigenous ethnic groups of northeastern India. They are a part of the greater Bodo-Kachari family of ethnolinguistic groups of Northeast India which includes Boro, Tripuri, Rabha, Garo, Tiwa, Koch, Moran etc. peoples of northeast india. They speak Dimasa language a Boro-Garo language of the Tibeto-Burman family.

Dimasa men are divided into 40 patriarchal clans. These are: 

 Ardaosa
 Mitherpangsa
 Diphusa
 Hagjersa
 Thaosensa 
 Phonglosa
 Sengyungsa
 Raijungsa
 Bader-Baiga
 Daulagajao
 Daolagupu
 Hojaisa
 Kemprai
 Jidungsa
 Baindosa (Nunisa)
 Khersa
 Hasnu
 Haflongbar
 Bodosa/Bathari
 Hapila
 Diruwasa
 Naidingsa
 Daodunglangtha
 Karigapsa 
 Joraisa
 Hasamsa
 Nabensa
 Dibragede
 Langthasa
 Girisa
 Porbosa
 Maibangsa
 Johorisa
 Sorongpang
 Gorlosa
 Hakmaosa
 Maramsa
 Jrambusa 
 Labtaisa
 Laobangdisa

Distribution

Dimasa Kachari is mainly found in the present-day Dima Hasao District (Old name "North Cachar Hills" or "N. C. Hills") of Assam. They also have a sizeable population in Cachar, Karbi Anglong, Nowgong, Hailakandi and Karimganj Districts of the Assam State and also Dimapur and Jiribam region of Nagaland and Manipur state respectively. In Cachar, following the formal conversion of their king Krishna Chandra Hasnusa to Hinduism, Dimasa has largely adopted Hinduism. These new converts to Hinduism are called Barman of Cachar. On the other hand, in Nowgong District the Dimasa have come under the influence of Assamese Vaishnavism, and there they are called Hojai Kachari Dimasa of Kapili valley were known as Hojai (Hojai is also a name of a Dimasa male clan). This term also stands for the priest). In Dima Hasao district, a section of the Dimasa called Semsas is confined within the historical village named Semkhor'; they eventually developed a distinct dialect. A similar minor distinction exists within the Dimasa based on the region they inhabit like Hawarsa, Dembrasa, Hamrisa, Dijuwasa and Hasaosa and Walgongsa.

State formation

The Dimasas formed one of the early states in Assam.  They established their initial capital in Dimapur, now in Nagaland.  Their initial skirmishes with the Ahom kingdom in the 15th century resulted in wins, but in the 16th century they faced a series of defeats and had to retreat to Maibang.  At Maibang, they Dimasa king and the elite came under Hindu influences; and finally in the 18th century, the king and followers settled in Khaspur following a marital alliance with the erstwhile ruler of the region.  These movements of the capital followed the movement of the Dimasa elite, with the common Dimasa folks remaining in place.  At Khaspur the Dimasa king and his family converted to Hinduism, but his tribesmen continued to follow the old tribal customs. Raja Govind Chandra Hasnu was the last king of Dimasa Kingdom.

Religion 

According to the 2011 Census of India, more than 99% of all Dimasa living in Assam are Hindu. In a Dimasa society, it is believed spiritual life, Spirit is a soul. Dimasa believe traditionally the rebirth of soul after death.
Dimasa believe that they are the children of Bangla Raja and the great divine bird Aarikhidima. The six sons namely- Sibrai, Doo Raja, Naikhu Raja, Waa Raja, Gunyung Brai Yung, Hamyadao born to Bangla Raja and Arikhidima are their ancestors and the Dimasa consider them to be their ancestral gods. They are called Madai in Dimasa. The evil spirits born out of the seventh egg of Arikhidima are responsible for the diseases, sufferings and natural calamities.
Many Dimasa consider themselves to be Hindus although they have their traditional gods and goddesses. Among the six ancestral gods, Sibrai being the eldest, is the most important and during worship his name is to be uttered first. Sibrai is equated with Hindu Siva and Ranachandi with Parbati or Kali. The Dimasa also believe that Matengma, Hirimdi and Kamakhya are other names of Ranachandi.
The whole Dimasa kingdom in bygone days was divided into twelve religious areas called Daikho. There are twelve priests for twelve Daikhos. The priest of a Daikho is called Zonthai. He has supreme authority in matters of deities and religion and above Zonthai is there is Zonthaima. Dain-yah is the one who sacrifice animal. Hojai performs the rituals over the twelve Zonthais of twelve Daikhos, there is a principal priest or chief priest called Gisiya. The selected person will get the Zonthaiship only when Gisiya offers him holy water called Dithar (Di-gathar).
The Dimasa concept of heaven and hell is also very faint. according to their belief Firinghi is heaven, Damra is the land for the dead where the dead persons retain their original form.
Manner is a human virtue inherent in man's character, also and passed from father to son and mother to daughter.

Society 

In Dimasa, the village system is called Nohlai meaning a cluster of houses and the whole village with its population is called Raji. Dimasa tend to live on river banks and next to streams. Therefore, Dimasa Kachari villages are on hills, with thirty to fifty, though sometimes (rarely) as many as four hundred houses. The houses are built in two facing rows. The houses, with a timber superstructure, mud-plastered bamboo walls, and thatched roof are called Noh-Dima.
Each families in a village has a few fruit trees—like Guava, mango, Jack fruit, plaintain and others.

The traditional village headman, who is at the top of the village administration, is a Khunang. He has both executive and judiciary powers.
He is assisted by another official called the Dillik (Assistant Headman). Next to him is Daulathu who occupies the third place. Next to the Daulathu is the Haphaisgao, who holds office for two years. Other village officials include Phrai, Montri, Hangsbukhu, and Jalairao.

Dimasa houses use a floor plan called Noh-Dima that partitions the structure into a drawing room, sleeping room, kitchen room, and granary. A place for pounding rice is called Thengkhikho in Dimasa. Santho-rimin is another kind of pounding rice tool. Dimasa use a household article like to keep water used the bamboo and for cooking use silver utensil, spoon made of wood and Dish made of wood and banana leaf and other, a house for latrine, bath room and others also.
The village, earlier in Dimasa society, there is grouping system of houses which is called punji which consisted of one a place around. Nohdrang named in Dimasa called club is placed in the middle or centre in the village or punji. The road communication is connect from the village to centre i.e. market, shop, town and another place.
In the socio-economic life of the Dimasa, the role played by livestock is of great significance. Domesticated animals and birds are not only required during the celebration of socio-religion festivals and performance of rituals but required for Domestic consumption and sometimes for commercial purposes also. The Dimasa Kachari rears Buffalo, Pigs, Fowls, Goats, Ducks, Cows and others.
Many stone monoliths are lying scattered at Kachomari pathar on the Daiyang river in Golaghat district Assam, bears the triumphant victory in the battles many times by Dimasa King from the 13th century. The remains of the palatial buildings, the traditional capital gateway and the decorative art of architecture, geometric and floral ornamentation found in these relics are marvelous. The sculptural design of animals and birds on the pillars at Dimapur by Raja Makardwaj Thousen in the tenth century show clearly the state of cultural development of the Dimasa Kachari. Many erected ramparts, temples were not seen at capital complex Dimapur due to the destruction by Ahom period in 1536. Stone house was erected at Maibang by Raja Harish Chandra Hasnusa in the 16th century. Stone inscription was installed at capital gate of Maibang by Raja Meghanarayan Hasnusa and statue of Horse is a worthable.
Numerous temples of Garhere vitor, Khaspur and Singhadowar of Khaspur both palaces of Queen Indraprava Devi were erected by Dimaraja in the 18th century bear the cultural of that time.

Customs

As Dimasa Kachari have both male clan and female clans their law inheritance is somewhat peculiar in nature. The Dimasa have a patriarchal society. But in spite of that they have three types of property namely paternal property, maternal property and common property. The paternal property consists of real estates, weapons, cash money and the cattle. The maternal or mothers property consists of jewellery, clothes and looms with their accessories used by the mother. The common property consists of the cooking utensil, brass-metal dishes and bowls and other household equipment. According to the customary law of inheritance of the Dimasa, while the paternal property is inherited by the sons, the maternal property is inherited by the daughters and common property is shared by the sons and daughters equally.

Occupation 

Agricultural is the principal occupation and main source of livelihood of the Dimasa Kacharis. Dimasa were compelled to adopt shifting cultivation, commonly known as jhum, in hilly areas. Tracts of plains land suitable for permanent cultivation lying here and there between the ridges are very few. The Dimasa mainly cultivate maize, sesame, cotton and others. Many Dimasa families cultivate pineapples, oranges, cotton and mustard to a limited extent. In the jhum site itself a house to store the harvested paddy is erected and this house is called Mandu. Biba's meaning is to be applied to a boys and girls to carry the paddy to his own house from the keeping Mandu.

Festivals

Busu is an important festival celebrated by the Dimasa with the celebration of great pomp and splendour. It is celebrated after completion of harvest. The word Busu gives the meaning such as Brai-Sibrai is a supreme God in Dimasa society. So, in this way, the entire harvesting new paddy is offered first to the Brai Shivarai madai for peace of the human kind is called Busu. Phangsla, an artistically designed gate, is erected at the village entrance for the Bishu festival. Busu Dima has a three kind namely Surem Busu observe for three or five days, Hangseu Manaoba Busu is observed for seven days and Jidab Busu is for only one day. Gajaibao is selected as a head of the festival. He is in charge of the festival. Meats of animals and birds killed are consumed in a communal feast on the very day. Busu is followed by singing accompanied by the rhythm of Kharams (drums), Muri, the wooden  continues first to third days without stop. Man and woman, Boys and Girls and others with their traditional dress spends whole night by dancing in the festival. In the afternoon local games like long jump, high jump, stone throw is organised in front of Nodrang in last day. Busu Garba is conducted by the Khunang with elders. Any chief guest, invited guest has to be welcome by playing the Muri(fife) and Kharam(drums) in any occasion in Dimasa society.

Among the festivals of the Dimasa, Busu is the most joyous and important community festival. The festival is usually celebrated in the month of January, when all sort or works of the jhum are completed. Thus the Busu is an occasion for relaxation from hard toils. It can, therefore be termed as harvesting festival or a festival of rejoicing and merry making. Hence the participation in this celebration is not restricted to any one. The festival may be celebration at an agreed time according to the convenience of the village people. But since 1994 as per the decision of Dimasa community of Dima Hasao, the Autonomous Council of Dima Hasao had officially declared 27 January as Busu festival day.

The Busu festival can be divided into the following categories:-

Bushu Jidap

Busu Jidap is generally observed for one to three days. It is celebrated under the guidance of the leadership of the Khunang or Gaonbura. The first day is called mi-staiba meaning slaughtering day of animals for feast. The animal is slaughtered in the morning and in the afternoon they held a community feast called Khalaima khamba in the house of Khunang. When the sun goes down the competition called Baiba Bdailaiba consisting of singing, dancing and playing musical instruments of Muree are held in the courtyard of the bachelor's traditional house called Nohdrang. The bonfire is lit in the middle of the dancing ground which lightens the ground and serves to warm up themselves from the cold night. The best dancers and "Muri" players are given prizes. The whole night is then passed in dancing and merry making. The second day is called Bushuma, meaning the main Bushu day. It is on this day the children or juniors pay respect and adoration, to their parents or elders. It is done individually or collectively. This kind of ceremonial blessing is called Bushu Gaba, and is usually undertaken before the mid noon. The whole day passed in eating meat and drinking rice beer. In the afternoon the traditional long-jump called Harang baiba and Shot-put or longthailemba are played in a particular selected level area. The game is meant only for the senior married persons, naturally householder. The declared hero or winner has to entertain the villagers with rice beer and meat.
On the third and last day young boys and young girls pay a house to house visit by singing and dancing in the courtyard of the selected well to do persons of the village. Whatever they collect either in cash or in kind from this process is eventually used for their feast. In the evening or at the dawn of the morning according to the instructions of the village priest they end their dance and playing musical instruments. On behalf of his village the priest then perform Gerba on the main road of the village by sacrificing a fowl to the deity of the village for omissions and commission during the festivals. This is called Lamphungba, and by sacrificing this ritual means the end of the festival.

Surem Baino 

It is generally celebrated for five days. Surem Baino, unlike the Busu Jidap, is celebrated under the guidance of Gajaibao not of the Khunang (Village headman). When a village is supposed to observe the Surem Baino, they would have to elect or select the Gajaibao or leader or guardian for it long before the celebration. The Surem celebration is then undertaken in the courtyard of Gajaibao. The function like dancing, singing is also held in the compound of Gajaibaos whereas in the Jidap they observe in the Nodrang. These are the differences between Jidap and Surem Baino.

Hangseu Manaoba 

The Busu, the most joyous festival of the Dimasas are celebrated widely through its stages of Jidap or Surem. But the third and the grandest category Hangseu Manaoba is mostly celebrated by a large village where there are large numbers of Hangseu or youths. As Hangseu Manaoba is to be celebrated for seven days or seven nights without stopping of the Khrams (drums) and Muree (trumpet), music, dance, feasting and drinking, therefore the undertaking of this particular category needs a sound economy and healthy background of the village. Due to this the youths take initiative to collect fund long before its celebration. They therefore sometimes engaged as day labourers in the jhum of their fellow farmers for fund raising. Some village youths sometime even make a special jhum for this purpose and thus produce like vegetables, pumpkins, chillies, paddy and others, which are used for the occasion. The women folk also performs "haoba-ragai", community work in exchange for money or provision to celebrate this Busu. Provision for sufficient quantities of meat, and rice beer (judima), plantain leaves,  (bamboo cups), firewood for the whole night's bonfire as well as for cooking for the whole seven days have to be making by the youths accordingly. Busu being termed as community festival of merriment, generally the entire responsibility of the celebration is borne by the youths of the village. Throughout the celebration period the village people observe a ritual called Gerba, wherein the blessings are sought from the deity to protect the village. During the celebration of Bussu the village people do not go out for work or take up any kind of journey. Each and every one has to try their level best not to spoil the festivity spirit but to celebrate in its fullest way, which ought to be made.

It is in this Hangseu Manaoba as a mark of festivities and reception; the youths use to erect the traditional welcome gate called Phangsla, at the main entrance gate of the village. The Phangsla is wholly constructed with a bamboo, which is artistically designed and decorated with a splattered bamboo itself. In bygone days the Phangsla is supposed to be constructed only during the Hangseu Bishu, not on the Surem or Jidap. But nowadays, whether it is Jidap or Surem, one can see the Phangsla in the celebration of Busu, especially in the urban areas.
The celebration of Hangseu Manaoba is led under the guidance of selected leader Gajaibao. Besides this leader, they also have boys’ leader called Nagahoja and girls’ leader called Mathlahoja. In Dimasa, young boys or men are called Nagarao and young girls or women are called Malarao. Hangseu or Hangso is a youth organisation of which both the Nagarao and Malarao are members. They therefore work hard day and night under the guidance of the said three leaders to make the Hangseu Manaoba Busu a grand success.

First Day :The first day is called Hangseu Busu Rajini Sthaiba, which means the slaughtering day of animals by the village elders. In the morning the village deities are offered sacrifices either pigs, fowls or goats by the elders group. As each village has its own patron Madais, it therefore, is difficult to mention the names of the Madais here to whom the people would offer. But in every ritual Sibrai is remembered, as he is specially considered as the main deity of the Dimasa. The Madais are offered sacrifices to bless the celebration of the festival so that no accident or untoward incidents take place during the time of celebration. After the ritual ceremony is over a portion of the sacrificial meat are then cooked in the house of Khunang or Gajaibao, and the rest are distributed to each household as per their contribution. Then the village elder would feast together by eating the meat and drinking the rice beer. The youths and children are not allowed to join this feast, it is purely sacramental one. This is called Mido garba.

Second Day : The second day is called Nagaraoni Sthaiba, which means slaughtering day of the animals by the youths. In the morning the buffalo which was solely bought by the Hangseus or youth members is killed and prepared a portion of the meat for their grand feast and the rest are distributed to each Hangso members. Before they eat the cook meat, a handful of the meat curry is offered to the deity Sibarai. While offering the meat to Sibarai, the following sacred songs are pronounced by one and all, so that they could have a blessed Busu.

                              

                              Not by our wishes,
                              But, because of Sibrai we see this day,
                              Let us make merry and be happy,
                              as this day comes only but once.

After one and all saying the above songs, on behalf of the Busu leader (Gajaibao), and Hangsong youths` association they hold a community feast called Suba jiba. The whole day they eat, drink and rejoice. In the evening, when the sun is about to set, the youths hold a community singing fiesta called Bagaoba. The song is sung generally in a position of standing in lines in a procession type in the open space as if they recharged the spirit of festivity in their midst. The following song is one of the oldest songs of the Hangseu Bushu, which is believed to have its origin from the Zeme Princess. (It is said that once a Dimasa Prince married a Zeme girl which is traditionally considered to be the source of this song).
Hangso Manaubani Bagauthai
                              

This procession is held to call the people to participate in the festival forgiving debts and forgetting grievances, differences and enmity. The second day ends in eating. Drinking and in entertaining guests, friends and relatives.
Third Day : The third day is called Busuma. It is considered as the main Busu day. One this day the children or juniors show respect to their elders and pay ceremonial homage to the elders and offer a Busu present like a handful of cook meat and a cup full of rice beer. It is done individually or collectively and is usually undertaken within the 12 noon. This kind of ceremonial blessing is called Busu Gaba. One this day not only pay homage to the living but they also pay homage to the spirits of the dead of the preceding year. This last offering of food and drink to the dead "homage ritual" is known as Makhamgarkhaoba.
A community feast is also arranged on this day. Every family entertained people in the house with a handful of meat in a plantain and a bamboo cup of ju. In the afternoon the badailaiba or traditional sports like longthailemba meaning stone throwing and harong baiba meaning long-jump for the elders are held. These competitions, held in the spirit of friendship and understanding, are meant to entertain and the people have fun and laugh.
When the sun goes down, on the courtyard of the Gajaibao a bonfire is lit to warm up from the breezy cold night or to lighten the dancing ground. The young boys and girls, men and women then put on their best traditional dresses and ornaments to take part in the famous Baiba dance. They perform various kinds of dances like Baidima, Jaupinbani, Daislaibani, Jaubani, etc. The good dancers are given prizes. The boys and girls merrily dance together to the music of Kharam and Muree throughout the night, while old men and women and children assembled to witness the gleeful dance of the youths. While watching the skill of their young ones, old men, old women sometimes recalling their sweet bygone days even join the dance for a while just for mirth and fun. Drinks are an essential part of the festival and are distributed in fresh  (bamboo tube cups) while meat is served in plaintive leaves. While the old aged group cannot take part in the entertainment, they gather in a Khunang house sitting around the fireplace, chatting, joking and tell stories, drinking, eating to their hearts` content. This is how the third day and night passes by.
Fourth to Sixth days : The fourth, fifth and sixth days are called Baikhaoba or Jikhaoba. On these days too community feast are held. The days are spent mainly in eating, drinking, singing and dancing and merrymaking. People go from house to house to share the joy of the festivity and each family provides them with ample food and drinks by each family.
During these days they will perform the dances in the courtyard of the selected well to do family and to the leaders house. This is called Baisingba. This Social festivity continues till sixth noon. In the morning of the sixth day the youth go round the village singing, dancing and playing music. This is called digarlaiba. For the last dance, they again assembled in the dancing ground by performing the dance in merry go round. In the middle of the arena they made a pothole in the ground and let a pitcherful of water and the blood of an earlier sacrificial buffalo, and make watery muddy for playing purposes. After singing and dancing for sometime the dancers, children along with their bachelors leader Nagahoja or Mathlahoja facing to the main door of the house of Gajaibao (Hangseu Busu Leader) and proceed as if in the coming and going for three times. In the same time some youths behave like monkeys and pull out the main door of the Gaijaibao's house replace it the new one. Pulling out the door may symbolise the end of the Gajaibao's responsibility. This is known as derga khouma, meaning the door id pulled off. The pulled door was then carried in procession to the river. During the procession they throw the prepared watery muddy at each other in a playful way. This kind of playing with mud is known as Didap Hulaiba. As soon as they each the river the door is thrown into the water and everyone takes their bath. This simply signifies that the festival has comes to an end.

Idea: Dimasa has a concept and idea to uplight his own society. It has an education for preparation of intellectual. Dimasa has a conception of philosophy to rebirth the soul.
Social: A Dimasa family generally consists of the head of the family, his wife, their unmarried son and daughter and unmarried brothers and sisters of the family.
Dimasa Kachari has forty male clans called Sengphong and forty two female clan called Julu. The Dimasa society has its own society system of marriage. Existence of female clans along with the male can makes the Dimasa marriage somewhat complicated. The male clans and female clans are exogamous and no marriage can take place between the boys and the girls of the same clan whether be it patri clan or matri clan and however distantly related they might be i.e. A boy belong to Kemprai clan (Patri clan can never marry a girl of a Kemprai father although they might be very distantly related.
The ritual performance: The Dimasa have a cremation ground called Mangkhulong. Dimasa cremate the dead body after death. But in olden times and days, this performance has to be conducted after one month or a year gathering all relation and others.

Dress and ornaments

Women
 Rijamphain: white cloth with worn from chest to knees
 Rijamphain beren (ramai): chest wrapper with stripes of bright colours like white, green (sometimes deep blue), black, yellow (sometimes orange) and red; worn only on special occasions (marriage, dance, festivals).
 Rigu:  wrapper or lower garment of various colours, worn from waist to ankle.
 Rikhaosa:  muffler of yellow, green or white, worn above the chest wrapper; also sometimes worn by males.
 Rigu-set was introduced recently due to influence of mainstream culture.  It is Dimasa mekhela Chadar, consisting of rigu (above) and set which is same piece of cloth that is draped like Indian saree. It can be of any colour.
 Bathormai: a kind of Rigu which has only one particular design, worn from waist to knees; it can be of different colours.

Men
 : a turban.  Phagri are of either green or yellow, but for marriages or dance the bridegroom or dancer wears white  tied with red ribbon to the chin.
 Rigdo:  short muffler, which can be of any colour.
 Risha: short dhoti worn from waist to knee and sometimes taken as muffler also; can be of different colours.
 Gainthao:  white long dhoti, worn from waist to ankle
 Riendi or : chaddar or shawl worn by men, usually made from Endi/Eri silk of silk worm.
 Remshau:  shawl, either white or yellow, with a distinctive colourful design embedded in white background
 Magong:  shawl of various colour

Ornaments
The male Dimasa use only two types of ornaments namely Yaocher and Kharik.

Females use:
 Phowal:  necklace made of expensive Coral and Real silver metal beads; also worn by males
 Jongsama:  necklace made of micro-beads of any colour, with coral and silver beads in between.
 Rangbarsha:  necklace made of coins.
 Chandrawal: necklace made of three silver chains with flower shapes.
 Rmailik:  necklace made of micro-beads; the colour pattern is same with the Rijamphain beren or Rmai (chest wrapper)
 Likjao: necklace made of Red micro beads
 Likshim: necklace made of black micro beads
 Khadu: heavy silver bangle
 Khamaothai: silver or gold earring
 Yaoshidam: finger ring

Dances 
The dance forms of the Dimasa Kachari are complex in character. They are strictly dependent on instrumental music. No songs are used. Kharam (drum) follows the rhythm of the Muri (fife) and so also the dancers. Though one may find the music from Muri to be monotonous, there are variations with noticeable microtones for different dance forms. That is why young men practice dancing at Nodrang during leisure hours and the village children follow the rhythm and stepping at a distance from an early age.

Any Dimasa dance is called Baidima ( Bai-means dance, Dima-means Dimasa). Different kinds of Dimasa dances are-Baidima (Hasao), Baidijuwa, Baidembra, Baimaijai (It means a cultural performance with stone siever once a time during Dimapur reign, so called Baimaiajai. Now-a-days its unable to perform with stone siever. So cultural performer conducts with plate or Dish during Festival time.), Baijabah (war dance), Hadoobani, Jaubani, Jauphinbani, Ren-gnibani, Baichergi, Khunlubani, Dainselaibani, Khamauthaikhim Khaubani, Nanabairibani, Burunjala Khalaibani, Homau daobani, Hakhor Jaobani, Rong-jaobani, Dausimaikhabani, Dauyungjang, Nowaijang dainlaibani, Nah-rimbani, Rogidaw Bihimaiyadao, Maijaobani, Maishubani, Rishibani, Mishai Bonthai Jibani, Madaikhilimbani and others.

See also 
 Dimaraji
 Kachari language

Notes

References

 

 Bareh, H. Gazetteer of India
 Barman, N. K. Queen of Cachar of Herambo and the History of the Kachchhari
 Barpujari, S. K. (ed) (1997) History of the Dimasas: from the earliest times to 1896 AD, Haflong: Autonomous Council, N.C. Hills District (Assam) .
 
 
 Bordoloi, B. N. (1988) The Dimasa Kachari, Tribal Research Institute of Assam, Guwahati.
 Danda, D. (1989) The Dimasa Kacharis of Assam, Concept Publishing co. New Delhi.
 Gait, Edward A. (1906) A History of Assam, Calcutta 1906.
 Rhodes, N. G. and Bose, S. K. (2006) A History of the Dimasa Kacharis - As Seen through Coinage New Delhi : Mira Basu Publishers.
 Roy, Babul (1998) "Socio-Cultural and Environmental Dimensions of Tribal Health: A Study among the Dimasa Kacharis and the Zeme Nagas of N. C. Hills in Assam" Ph. D. Thesis (Unpublished), Gauhati University, Guwahati, Assam (India).
 Roy, Babul (2000) "Medical Pluralism and Pattern of Acceptance of Medicine among the Dimasa Kacharis of Assam" The Journal of Human Ecology. Kamal-Raj Pub., Delhi.
 Roy, Babul (2002) "Descent groupings, belief system and social structure among the Dimasa Kacharies of Assam", Man in India, Vol.82,No.1&2.
 
 

Bodo-Kachari
Ethnic groups in Northeast India
Hindu ethnic groups
Social groups of Assam
Tribes of Assam
Scheduled Tribes of Meghalaya
Ethnic groups in South Asia